Roboexotica (sometimes spelled: Roböxotica) is an annual festival and conference where scientists, researchers, computer experts and artists from all over the world build cocktail robots and discuss technological innovation, futurology and science fiction.
Roboexotica is also an ironic attempt to criticize techno-triumphalism and to dissect technological hypes.

The festival is currently produced by art collective monochrom. Until 2018, the festival was a cooperation of monochrom, Shifz, and the 'Bureau for Philosophy' (of the Department of Philosophy, University of Vienna).

The festival is usually held in the end of November or early December.

Overview
The annual international festival consists of an exhibition, a conference, social events, and the ACRA (Annual Cocktail Robot Award).

The exhibition presents robots that can mix cocktails, serve cocktails, consume cocktails, have bar conversations, light or smoke cigarettes or manage to impress the jury with (quote Roboexotica website) "other achievements in the sector of cocktail culture".

History
Starting in 1993, art and technology group monochrom (Johannes Grenzfurthner, Franz Ablinger) published an alternative magazine and online bulletin that featured blueprints for interesting DIY projects (like creating a DIY isolation tank or building rocket out of an office water cooler) and released articles and pamphlets that criticized the "uninspired and martial" machine culture (e.g. poking fun at Survival Research Labs and etoy) and supported a more playful way to create robots, specifically demanding that robots should "party with us, not work for us."
In 1999, Magnus Wurzer and Chris Veigl (of Shifz) presented a self-made bar robot at the small independent Viennese culture and art space VEKKS. monochrom took interest and participated with performances and presented machines, and soon teamed up with Shifz as organizers and the small event became a big international festival presented at Vienna's Museumsquartier and several other locations in the Vienna metro area. Roboexotica presents around 20 machines every year and draws around 3000 guests per event. The event is attracting robot builders from all over the world.

Roboexotica was presented at Cyberpipe (Ljubljana) in 2006, at Maker Faire (San Francisco) and RoboGames (San Francisco) in 2007.

Bre Pettis got inspired during an art residency in Vienna with Johannes Grenzfurthner/monochrom in 2007, when he wanted to create a robot that could print shot glasses for Roboexotica and did research about the RepRap project at the Vienna hackerspace Metalab. Shot glasses remained a theme throughout the history of MakerBot.

In 2008 a catalogue titled Roboexotica was published, celebrating the 10th anniversary of the festival. The book features reflections on the festival and presents statements by former participants including Cory Doctorow, Dorkbot's Doueglas Repetto, Bre Pettis, V. Vale, Karen Marcelo of Survival Research Laboratories or RoboGames' David Calkins and Simone Davalos.

A smaller show called "Roboexotica USA" was held in San Francisco in 2008 and 2009. It was organized by monochrom and Shifz and was well received by the press. In 2010 it was decided to rename the San Francisco-based cocktail robot event "Barbot," and Barbot events were held in San Francisco in 2010, 2011, 2012, and 2013.

Chase Masterson was special guest star at the 20th anniversary edition of the cocktail robot festival, and performed a live jazz set for "robots and humans".

In 2020 and 2021 the festival was adapted into a delivery service. monochrom offered to bring cocktail robots in a van to customers in the greater Vienna area and mix cocktails for them. The whole event was live-streamed as a videocast and hosted by Johannes Grenzfurthner, who also interviewed artists and technologists from all around the globe.

In 2022, Roboexotica was invited to host the opening night party at Fantastic Fest.

Reception
Roboexotica has been featured in Slashdot, Wired News, Reuters, New York Times, CNet and blogs like Boing Boing and New Scientist.

References

External links

 
 Speaking in Vienna this weekend at Roboexotica: the cocktail robotics festivalarticle from BoingBoing

1999 in robotics
Annual events
Art festivals in Austria
Festival organizations in Europe
Festivals in Vienna
Futures studies media
Innovation
Monochrom
New media art festivals
New media art
Recurring events established in 1999
Robotic art
Robotics events
Science fiction
Technology conferences
Technology conventions